Paseo de Roxas is a prime commercial artery in the Makati Central Business District of Metro Manila, Philippines. It is a two- to six-lane avenue that cuts through the middle of the business district connecting San Lorenzo Village in the west to Bel-Air Village in the east.

Starting at its western terminus at Antonio S. Arnaiz Avenue (Pasay Road), Paseo de Roxas crosses into Legaspi Village passing by the Greenbelt mall complex, the Asian Institute of Management, as well as several low to mid rise office and residential towers. As it passes by Salcedo Village east of Ayala Avenue, the buildings give way to high rises on the north side and the entire length of the Ayala Triangle Gardens on the south. Past the intersection with Makati Avenue, Paseo de Roxas skirts the northern side of Urdaneta Village. It then crosses Gil Puyat Avenue and Jupiter Street before entering the gated Bel-Air Village, where it ends at its intersection with Mercedes and Hydra Streets.

The avenue was named after Ayala Corporation founder Domingo Róxas of the Zobel de Ayala family that owns the land. It was the site of the old Nielson Field airport where the avenue's section east of Ayala Avenue served as a runway along with Ayala Avenue. Paseo de Roxas also has short extensions into the gated San Lorenzo Village as Edades Street and in the gated Bel-Air Village as Hydra Street.

Notable landmarks
Paseo de Roxas is the address of the Asian Institute of Management, which occupies a full block on the north side of the street between Benavidez and Gamboa Streets across from Greenbelt. The street also hosts the headquarters of a number of banks, notably the Bank of the Philippine Islands (BPI), Chinabank, Citibank Philippines, and PSBank. The intersection of Paseo de Roxas and Ayala Avenue is framed by The Enterprise Center Tower 1, Ayala Tower One, the former site of BPI Building (to be replaced by the future BPI Headquarters) and Insular Life Building which featured the Philippine Stock Exchange LED Display, the first and longest curved-type LED display in Southeast Asia.

Paseo de Roxas is also home to a number of other skyscrapers such as the Philamlife Tower, Zuellig Building, One Roxas Triangle, Lepanto Building and The Residences at Greenbelt's Manila Tower. Across the street from the Ayala Triangle Gardens is the Paseo Center which houses a Rustan's Supermarket and a flagship branch of Anytime Fitness.

References

Streets in Metro Manila
Makati
Makati Central Business District